Lieutenant-General Sir Andrew Agnew, 5th Baronet JP (21 December 1687 – 14 August 1771) was the son of Sir James Agnew, 4th Baronet and Lady Mary Montgomerie.

Succession
He succeeded his father as 5th Baronet, of Lochnaw on the latter's death on 9 March 1735. On his death in 1771 he was succeeded in the baronetcy by his son.

Family
He married Eleanora Agnew, daughter of Captain Thomas Agnew and Florence Stewart on 12 May 1714, and had issue:
he had seventeen children, including:
Sir Stair Agnew, 6th Baronet (1734–1809)

Warfare
Sir Andrew Agnew of Lochnaw (5th Baronet) commanded his men "Dinna fire till ye can see the whites of their e'en," from which the saying "Don't fire until you can see the whites of their eyes" is taken.

At Dettingen, Bavaria, on 27 June 1743, Lieutenant-Colonel Sir Andrew gave to the men or his regiment, the 21st (Royal North British Fusilier) Regiment of Foot, an order from which this saying is derived. A man of spirit even for the times, he had earlier in the day replied to a brigade order that "the scoundrels will never have the impudence to attack the Scots Fusiliers", but they did.
Formed in square, the Scots Fusiliers held a steady fire rolling along their lines and kept off the advancing French infantry.
Sir Andrew, a resourceful and experienced officer, had in training practiced a novel battle drill with the men in his square, should they be attacked by cavalry.
At last, the opportunity to spring this trap appeared when the square was attacked by enemy cuirassiers. Instead of employing the orthodox tactic of seeing them off by standing firm and taking the charge on muskets and pikes, Sir Andrew gave orders that, as the cavalry approached the front line, the two center companies should divide from the center and fall back from the outer markers. This novel approach allowed the cavalry to charge through a lane with the Fusiliers facing inwards. At this point Sir Andrew gave the command:
"Dinna fire till ye can see the whites of their e' en . . . if ye dinna kill them they'll kill you." The French, as they rode through this lane of soldiers, were subjected to a withering crossfire and destroyed.
Later in the day King George II, who commanded the Army but was a little out of his depth, rode up and said: "So, Sir Andrew, I hear the cuirassiers rode through your regiment today."
"Ou, ay, yer Majestee," was the reply "but they dinna get oot again."

He was appointed Governor of Tynemouth until his death in 1771.

References
thePeerage.com
Phrases.org.uk

Notes

1687 births
1771 deaths
British Army lieutenant generals
Royal Scots Fusiliers officers
British Army personnel of the War of the Austrian Succession
Baronets in the Baronetage of Nova Scotia
Andrew